The 1999 Save Mart/Kragen 350 was a NASCAR Winston Cup Series race held at Sears Point Raceway, Sonoma, California on June 27, 1999. It was the 16th points-paying event of the 1999 NASCAR Winston Cup Series season. Jeff Gordon won the pole race for the second consecutive year. A total of 51 cars attempted the race.

Summary

Results

References

Save Mart/Kragen 350
Save Mart/Kragen 350
NASCAR races at Sonoma Raceway